Pío Baroja y Nessi (28 December 1872 – 30 October 1956) was a Spanish writer, one of the key novelists of the Generation of '98. He was a member of an illustrious family. His brother Ricardo was a painter, writer and engraver, and his nephew Julio Caro Baroja, son of his younger sister Carmen, was a well-known anthropologist.

Biography
Pío was born in San Sebastian, Guipuzcoa, the son of Serafin Baroja, also a noted writer and opera librettist.

The young Baroja studied medicine at University of Valencia and received a doctorate at the Complutense University in Madrid at 21. Although educated as a physician, Baroja practiced only briefly in the Basque town of Cestona. His memories of student life became the raw material for his novel The Tree of Knowledge. He also managed the family bakery for a short time, running unsuccessfully on two occasions for a seat at the Cortes Generales (the Spanish parliament) as a Radical Republican. Baroja's true calling, however, was always writing, which he began seriously at the age of 13.

Baroja's first novel, La casa de Aizgorri (The House of Aizgorri, 1900), is part of a trilogy called La Tierra Vasca (The Basque Country, 1900–1909). This trilogy also includes El Mayorazgo de Labraz (The Lord of Labraz, 1903), which became one of his most popular novels in Spain.

Baroja is best known internationally for another trilogy, La lucha por la vida (The Struggle for Life, 1922–1924), which offers a vivid depiction of life in Madrid's slums. John Dos Passos greatly admired these works and wrote about them.

Another major work, Memorias de un Hombre de Acción (Memories of a Man of Action, 1913–1931), offers a depiction of one of his ancestors who lived in the Basque region during the Carlist uprising in the 19th century.

Another of Baroja's trilogies is called La mar (The sea) and comprises La estrella del capitán Chimista, Los Pilotos de altura and Los mercaderes de esclavos. Baroja also wrote the biography of Juan Van Halen, a Spanish military adventurer.

Baroja's masterpiece is considered to be El árbol de la ciencia (1911) (translated as The Tree of Knowledge), a pessimistic Bildungsroman that depicts the futility of the pursuit of knowledge and of life in general. The title is symbolic: the more the chief protagonist, Andres Hurtado, learns about and experiences life, the more pessimistic he feels and the more futile his life seems.

In keeping with Spanish literary tradition, Baroja often wrote in a pessimistic, picaresque style. His deft portrayal of the characters and settings brought the Basque region to life much as Benito Pérez Galdós's works offered an insight into Madrid. Baroja's works were often lively but could be lacking in plot. They are written in an abrupt, vivid, yet impersonal style. He was accused of grammatical errors, which he never denied.

While young, Baroja believed loosely in anarchism, like others in the '98 Generation. He later admired men of action, similar to Nietzsche's superman. Catholics and traditionalists denounced him, and his life was at risk during the Spanish Civil War (1936–1939). In Youth And Egolatry (1917), Baroja described his beliefs as follows:

I have always been a liberal radical, an individualist and an anarchist. In the first place, I 
am an enemy of the Church; in the second place, I am an enemy of the State. When these great powers are in conflict I am a partisan of the State as against the Church, but on the day of the State's triumph, I shall become an enemy of the State. If I had lived during the French Revolution, I should have been an internationalist of the school of Anacharsis Cloots; during the struggle for liberty, I should have been one of the Carbonieri.

Ernest Hemingway was greatly influenced by Baroja and told him when he visited him in October 1956, "Allow me to pay this small tribute to you who taught so much to those of us who wanted to be writers when we were young. I deplore the fact that you have not yet received a Nobel Prize, especially when it was given to so many who deserved it less, like me, who am only an adventurer."

Baroja died shortly after this visit on 30th October and was buried in the Old Civil Cemetery of Madrid.

An Iberia Airbus A340-642, EC-JPU (in service between 2006-2020) was named after him.

Works available in English
 The City of the Discreet (1917). A.A. Knopf
 The Quest (1922) A.A. Knopf
 Weeds (1923). A.A. Knopf
 Red Dawn (1924). A.A. Knopf
 The Lord of Labraz (1926). A.A. Knopf
 The Restlessness of Shanti Andía, and other writings (1959). University of Michigan Press
 The Tree of Knowledge (1974). Howard Fertig: 
 Caesar or Nothing (1976). Howard Fertig: 
 Zalacain the Adventurer (1998). Lost Coast Press: 
 Youth And Egolatry (2004). Kessinger Publishing: 
 Road to Perfection (2008).  Oxbow Books:  (pbk.)

References

Further reading 
 Azurmendi, Joxe. 2006: "Pio Baroja: esencia española, cultura vasca" in Espainiaren arimaz, Donostia: Elkar. 
 Sogos, Sofia, "El árbol de la ciencia e la leyenda de Jaun de Alzate: L’espressione del pessimismo in Pío Baroja". Hrsg. von Giorgia Sogos. Bonn: Free Pen Verlag, 2017. .

Sources
 BookRags

External links 
 Short Biographies: Pio Baroja
 Pio Baroja Collection at the Harry Ransom Center at the University of Texas at Austin
 
 
 
 

1872 births
1956 deaths
People from San Sebastián
Complutense University of Madrid alumni
Members of the Royal Spanish Academy
Basque writers
Spanish novelists
Spanish male novelists
Spanish anti-communists
Spanish medical writers
Basque novelists
Burials at Cementerio de la Almudena
People educated at Instituto San Isidro